"Madame Helga" is a song by Welsh rock band Stereophonics from their fourth studio album, You Gotta Go There to Come Back (2003). It was inspired by the band's stay at Helga's Folly while they were on tour in Sri Lanka in 2002. The folly is owned by Helga Desilva Blow Perera, from whom the title "Madame Helga" originated. Released as a single on 19 May 2003, the song reached number four on the UK Singles Chart and number 15 on the Irish Singles Chart the same month.

"Madame Helga" is track three on You Gotta Go There to Come Back. There is also a live version of the track on the Live from Dakota album. The music video was directed by Robert Hales. Despite being one of the band's highest-charting singles, it is not included on the standard edition of the band's 2008 greatest hits album, Decade in the Sun: Best of Stereophonics.

Track listings
UK CD single
 "Madame Helga" – 3:56
 "High as the Ceiling" – 3:18
 "Royal Flush" (mono demo) – 3:29

UK DVD single
 "Madame Helga" (audio) – 3:56
 "Madame Helga" (live video)

UK 7-inch single
A. "Madame Helga" – 3:56
B. "High as the Ceiling" – 3:18

Credits and personnel
Credits are taken from the You Gotta Go There to Come Back album booklet.

Recording
 Written on 2 May 2002 in Sri Lanka
 Recorded between September and December 2002 at Hook End Manor (Checkendon, England)
 Mixed at Ocean Way (Hollywood, California)
 Mastered at Abbey Road Studios (London, England)

Personnel

 Kelly Jones – writing, vocals, guitars, production
 Richard Jones – bass, harmonica
 Stuart Cable – drums, percussion
 Andy Davies – recording assistant
 Jack Joseph Puig – mixing
 Jim Lowe – engineering
 Steve McNichol – Pro Tools engineering
 Chris Blair – mastering

Charts

Weekly charts

Year-end charts

References

2003 singles
2003 songs
Glam metal songs
Gospel songs
Music videos directed by Robert Hales
Songs written by Kelly Jones
Stereophonics songs
V2 Records singles